Bugti Militia was a militant group formed in Dera Bugti, Balochistan by Nawab Akbar Khan Bugti in 1952.The group believed in Baloch nationalism and fought for autonomy and more economic and political rights. The group took an active part in the 1970s Insurgency in Balochistan. However, it lost most of its fighters in Pakistani military operations and some of the surviving fighters went underground. In 2004, Nawabzada Brahamdagh Khan Bugti (the grandson of Akbar Bugti) regrouped the Bugti Militia fighters and formed the Baloch Republican Army.

See also
 Baloch Republican Army
 Balochistan conflict
 Balochistan Liberation Army
 Baloch Students Organization
 Balochistan Liberation Front
 Popular Front for Armed Resistance

References

External links
 https://web.archive.org/web/20070927225311/http://www.pips.com.pk/san/pakistan/BSecurity.html

Baloch nationalist militant groups
Rebel groups in Pakistan
Paramilitary organisations based in Pakistan
National liberation movements
Nationalist organizations